Taganrog Priboy Plant is a company based in Taganrog, Russia.

A leading military sonar equipment producer, the Priboy Plant also produces electronic equipment for civilian use, as well as general consumer goods.

References

External links
 

Manufacturing companies of Russia
Companies based in Rostov Oblast
Sonar manufacturers
Ministry of the Shipbuilding Industry (Soviet Union)
Defence companies of the Soviet Union
Manufacturing companies of the Soviet Union
Electronics companies of the Soviet Union